The 2017 Liqui Moly Bathurst 12 Hour endurance race was a motorsport event for GT3 cars, GT3 Cup cars, GT4 cars and invited vehicles. It was staged at the Mount Panorama Circuit, near Bathurst, in New South Wales, Australia on 5 February 2017. The race, which was the 15th running of the Bathurst 12 Hour, was the opening round of the 2017 Intercontinental GT Challenge Series. For the first time, the winners of the race were awarded the Australian Tourist Trophy.

Of the 2016 winning drivers, Shane van Gisbergen moved from Tekno Autosports and McLaren to Scott Taylor Motorsport's Mercedes-AMG GT3, prepared by HTP Motorsport with factory Mercedes backing, Álvaro Parente remained with Tekno Autosports and Tekno team owner Jonathon Webb did not drive.

The GT4 Class expanded for 2017 with eight entries, the Porsche Cayman, KTM X-Bow GT4, Ginetta G55 and Aston Martin Vantage GT4.

55 cars were entered (the largest field since the 2007 revival) and 51 cars started, with four entries withdrawn following crashes in practice and qualifying.

The race was won by Craig Lowndes, Jamie Whincup and Toni Vilander driving a Ferrari 488 GT3 entered by Maranello Motorsport.

Class structure 

2017 the first year all-professional driver rosters were permitted. Previously, teams were required one unseeded driver in each entry.

Cars competed in the following four classes.
 Class A – GT3 Outright
 Class APP (GT3 Pro) – for driver combinations with no unseeded drivers.
 Class APA (GT3 Pro-Am) – for driver combinations including one unseeded driver.
 Class AAM (GT3 Am) – for driver combinations including two or three unseeded drivers.
 Class B – GT3 Cup Cars
 Class C – GT4
 Class I – Invitational

Official results
Bold denotes category winner.

 Race time of winning car: 12:00:36.966
 Fastest race lap: 2:02.908 – Toni Vilander

References

External links
 
 2017 Liqui-moly Bathurst 12 Hour – 12 Hour Category Supplementary Regulations, as archived at web.archive.org
 Race Information - 2017 Liqui-Moly Bathurst 12 Hour, www.bathurst12hour.com.au, as archived at web.archive.org

 

Motorsport in Bathurst, New South Wales
Liqui Moly Bathurst 12 Hour
Liqui Moly Bathurst 12 Hour
Liqui